The violet-breasted sunbird (Cinnyris chalcomelas) is a species of bird in the family Nectariniidae.
It is found in Kenya and Somalia.

References

violet-breasted sunbird
Birds of East Africa
violet-breasted sunbird
Taxonomy articles created by Polbot